Ohrigstad Dam Nature Reserve Mpumalanga, Situated on the edge of the highveld plateau, the Ohrigstad Dam Nature Reserve covers an area of 2,400 ha around the dam which impounds a stretch of the Ohrigstad River.

References 

Mpumalanga Provincial Parks